Konaru or Kenaru, also rendered as Konowru, may refer to:
 Kenaru, Hormozgan
 Konaru, Hormozgan
 Konaru, Kerman
 Konaru, Shahdad, Kerman County, Kerman Province
 Konaru, Jiroft, Kerman Province